Intisar el-Zein Soughayroun (also: Intsar, al-Zein, el-Zein, Sghairyoun, Segayron) is a professor of archeology at the University of Khartoum. In early September 2019 Soughayroun became the Sudanese Minister for Higher Education in the Transitional Cabinet of Prime Minister Abdalla Hamdok, during the 2019 Sudanese transition to democracy.

Archaeological research
Soughayroun is a professor of archaeology at the University of Khartoum. She is involved in ongoing scientific collaboration with the University of Bergen in Norway. Her research interests include the archaeology of Islam in Sudan. She has worked on the site of Qasr Wad nimieri, which is 470 km north of Khartoum. She studied for her MA and her PhD at the American University in Cairo, with a doctoral dissertation examining Islamic domed tombs in Sudan; she graduated from her PhD in 1986.

Soughayroun was co-director of the Meroe Archival Project, which was a collaboration between the University of Reading and the University of Khartoum.

Publications include 

 Islamic Archaeology in the Sudan
 'Ottoman Archaeology of the Middle Nile Valley in the Sudan', in The Frontiers of the Ottoman World

2018–2019 Sudanese protests
Soughayroun participated in the 2018–2019 Sudanese protests. One of her nephews was killed in the 3 June 2019 Khartoum massacre. In early July 2019, she expressed scepticism regarding negotiations with the Transitional Military Council, based on past experience, and supported continued civil disobedience. She felt that the TMC was weakening in power.

Minister of Higher Education
In early September 2019, Soughayroun was appointed as the Minister of Higher Education of Sudan (or head of the Higher Education and Scientific Research Council) in the Transitional Cabinet of Prime Minister Abdalla Hamdok, during the 2019 Sudanese transition to democracy. Other women leaders of Sudan during the transitional period include Chief Justice Nemat Abdullah Khair, and Sovereignty Council members Aisha Musa el-Said and Raja Nicola.

References

1950s births
Government ministers of Sudan
Women government ministers of Sudan
Living people
People of the Sudanese Revolution
University of Khartoum alumni
Sudanese women archaeologists
Sudanese women academics
Sudanese social scientists
21st-century Sudanese women politicians
21st-century Sudanese politicians